Alamshir (also Romanized as Alamshīr) is a village in Nowkand Kola Rural District, in the Central District of Qaem Shahr County, Mazandaran Province, Iran. At the 2006 census, its population was 2,957, in 782 families.

References 

Populated places in Qaem Shahr County